The Transverse Valleys (Spanish: Valles transversales) are a group of transverse valleys in the semi-arid northern Chile. They run from east to west (traversing Chile), being among the most prominent geographical features in the regions they cross. They are located in the Chilean regions of Valparaíso, Coquimbo, and Atacama. They share some characteristics, such as reaching the Pacific Ocean without passing through an Intermediate Depression, being rather deep and dissecting the landscape, concentrating most agriculture and population in the areas through which they pass, and being intensively cultivated. They are one of the defining elements of the Chilean natural region of Norte Chico. The area of the Transverse Valleys spans roughly 600 km from north to south.

See also
Agriculture in Chile
Astronomy in Chile
Chilean Matorral
Diaguita
Flowering desert

References

Landforms of Atacama Region
Landforms of Coquimbo Region
Landforms of Valparaíso Region
Valleys of Chile